Oil pump may refer to:

 Hydraulic pump, which pressurizes hydraulic fluid in a hydraulic system
 Oil pump (internal combustion engine), a part of the lubrication system that pressurizes motor oil for distribution around the engine
 Pumpjack, often used to pump oil out of wells
 Submersible pump, often used to pump oil out of wells
 Vacuum pump, of a design which uses an oil seal